HMS Bombay was an 84-gun second rate ship of the line of the Royal Navy, launched on 17 February 1828 at Bombay Dockyard.

She was fitted with screw propulsion in 1861.

On 8 December 1864, members of the crew fielded a cricket side to play against the Buenos Aires Cricket Club in the opening of the BACC's new game field in Parque Tres de Febrero in Palermo, Buenos Aires, located where the Galileo Galilei planetarium is today. That day the BACC defeated the Bombay team by 85 runs to 31.

The ship would be destroyed in a fire on the River Plate, in a freak target practice accident. Her efficient ventilation system spread the fire of unknown origin during the target practice off Uruguay near Isla de Flores near Montevideo in the River Plate on 14 December 1864, destroying her and costing the lives of 93 of her crew of 619.

Notes

References

Lavery, Brian (2003) The Ship of the Line - Volume 1: The development of the battlefleet 1650-1850. Conway Maritime Press. .

Ships of the line of the Royal Navy
Canopus-class ships of the line
British ships built in India
1828 ships
Ship fires
Maritime incidents in December 1864
Shipwrecks